Gottfried, Count Huyn, Baron of Geleen  or Godefridus Comes ab Huyn Baro de Geleen (died 27 August 1657), rose to the rank of Field Marshal in the service of the Holy Roman Emperor during the 30 Years War.

Biography
Gottfried was born in Flanders. In 1615 he joined the Imperial Army of the Holy Roman Empire in Italy as a volunteer. In 1618 he joined the Anholt Regiment of the Bavarian Army and remained with the regiment rising to the rank of colonel. While serving in the regiment he participated in the Count of Tilly's  campaigns in Bohemia and the Rhine, then took part in the Siege of Magdeburg and at the Battle of Leipzig.

After Baron Geleen distinguished himself in 1632 by the defence of Wolfenbüttel against the Duke of Lüneburg, he received an independent command in Westphalia in June 1633. With luck and skill, he led his 10,000 Catholic League troops against the desultorily appearing armies of the Landgrave of Hesse-Kassel and the Duke of Lüneburg as well as against the Swedes under Torsten Stalhandske.

Geleen joined the imperial service in 1636 with the rank of generalwachtmeister (major-general). He fought in with the Imperial and Bavarian armies under Count of Hatzfeld and Count of Götz against Sweden and helped in the campaign that drove the Swedes under the command of Johan Banér back to the Baltic.

In 1639, after unification with the Bavarians under Franz von Mercy, the Emperor transferred the command on the Rhine to Geleen. He crossed the Rhine near Speyer in October that year, but soon had to recross in order to drive the enemy from the Rheingau. In September 1640, after he had besieged and occupied Bingen, he combined his force of 4,000 infantry and 2,000 cavalry with the imperial army under Leopold Wilhelm at Fritzlar, but detached his force from the main army, to besiege Friedberg, and then wintered in the bishoprics of Würzburg and Bamberg to guard them against an intended invasion of the Swedes.

In early 1641, he helped to drive Banér from the Upper Palatinate and then marched to the Rhine in April, where he spent the next year in Cologne under Hatzfeld on an indecisive campaign against Guébriant. Soon after leaving the army, Geleen was retired as Province Commander (Landcomthur)  of the Teutonic Order in the Bailiwick of Alden Biesen. But in 1644 he was called out of retirement by the Emperor on the advice of the Westphalian Circle.

Geleen and his troops joined Mercy at Aschaffenburg and followed him into Swabia. There Geleen commanded the right wing at the disastrous battle of Allerheim (Second Battle of Nördlingen). Mercy was killed and Geleen was captured, but after a short captivity Geleen was exchanged for the French General Gramont and then took command of the Bavarian army.

In 1646, Geleen, under the command of Leopold Wilhelm, took part in the campaign against Turenne and Wrangel, and in March of the following year, after the elector of Bavaria concluded ceasefire, he resigned from his command. He died in 1657 at Maastricht or Castle Alden Biesen; his lineage became extinct with the death of his nephew.

Notes

References

Attribution

External links

Year of birth unknown
1657 deaths
Military personnel of the Thirty Years' War
Field marshals of the Holy Roman Empire